Peter Feigl (born 30 November 1951) is an Austrian former professional tennis player. He was a quarterfinalist in the 1978 Australian Open, defeating Ken Rosewall in what would be Rosewall's final Grand Slam match. He reached a highest singles ranking of world No. 40 in May 1979.

ATP career finals

Singles (3 titles, 3 runner-ups)

Doubles (1 title, 2 runner-ups)

References

External links
 
 

Austrian male tennis players
1951 births
Living people
Tennis players from Vienna